Plaza Fabini, or Plaza Ingeniero Juan Pedro Fabini, also known as Plaza del Entrevero, is a square of the Uruguayan capital, Montevideo. It is located on Montevideo's main avenue, 18 de Julio Avenue, in the barrio of Centro and on its north side starts Libertador Avenue.

Its main fountain has a bronze sculpture of José Belloni called 'El Entrevero', which acts as the monument to the unknown soldier. Under the square, there is a municipal exposition area called Subte Municipal.

External links

IMM - Plaza Fabini

Centro, Montevideo
Squares in Montevideo